Pteroplatus variabilis is a species of beetle in the family Cerambycidae. It was described by Sallé in 1849.

References

Pteroplatini
Beetles described in 1849